Pandi Laço (born 21 March 1964 in Korçë) is an Albanian journalist, songwriter, presenter and scenarist. He is mostly known for his work on Albanian Eurovision songs, of which he wrote several. Pandi has worked with notable Albanian artists including Frederik Ndoci. Since a few years ago, he has started his own show called "Histori me Zhumues" (History with noise), a show for Albanian history in film and music.

Currently, he is a judge in The X Factor Albania, together with Altuna Sejdiu, Soni Malaj and Alban Skënderaj.

Notable writings
2005: "Tomorrow I Go" by Ledina Çelo.
2007: "Hear My Plea" by Frederik Ndoci.
2008: "Zemrën E Lamë Peng" by Olta Boka.
2015: "Dambaje" by Mishela Rapo.

References

Albanian songwriters
1964 births
Living people